Knock on Wood is the debut album of soul singer/songwriter Eddie Floyd, released in 1967 on Stax Records. The album was recorded between July and December 1966 at Stax Recording Studio. It features his most well-known single, the title track, "Knock on Wood".

Track listing
 "Knock on Wood" (Steve Cropper, Floyd) – 3:05
 "Something You Got" (Chris Kenner, Fats Domino) – 3:05
 "But It's Alright" (J.J. Jackson, Pierre Tubbs) – 2:53
 "I Stand Accused" (Billy Butler, Jerry Butler) – 3:21
 "If You Gotta Make a Fool of Somebody" (Rudy Clark)– 2:46
 "I Don't Want to Cry" (Luther Dixon, Chuck Jackson) – 2:50
 "Raise Your Hand" (Cropper, Floyd, Alvertis Isbell) – 2:26
 "Got to Make a Comeback" (Floyd, Joe Shamwell) – 2:40
 "634-5789" (Cropper, Floyd) – 3:03
 "I've Just Been Feeling Bad" (Cropper, Floyd) – 2:42
 "High-Heel Sneakers" (Robert Higginbotham) – 2:43
 "Warm and Tender Love" (Bobby Robinson) – 3:32

Chart and single history

Personnel
 Eddie Floyd – vocals
 Booker T. Jones – piano, organ
 Isaac Hayes – piano
 Steve Cropper – guitar
 Donald Dunn – bass guitar
 Al Jackson Jr. – drums
 Wayne Jackson – trumpet
 Andrew Love – tenor saxophone
 Floyd Newman – baritone saxophone

References

1967 debut albums
Eddie Floyd albums
Albums produced by Isaac Hayes
Stax Records albums
Albums produced by Steve Cropper